"Living for the City" is a 1973 single by Stevie Wonder from his Innervisions album. It reached number 8 on the Billboard Hot 100 chart and number 1 on the R&B chart. Rolling Stone ranked the song number 104 on their 2004 list of the "500 Greatest Songs of All Time".

Story and production
Born into a poor family in Mississippi, a young black man experiences discrimination in looking for work and eventually seeks to escape to New York City (alluding to the Second Great Migration) in hopes of finding a new life. Through a series of background noises and spoken dialogue, the man reaches New York by bus, but is then promptly framed for a crime, arrested, convicted and sentenced to ten years in prison.

Wonder played all the instruments on the song and was assisted by Malcolm Cecil and Robert Margouleff for recording engineering and synthesizer programming. Tenley Williams, writing in Stevie Wonder (2002), feels it was "one of the first soul hits to include both a political message and ... sampling ... of the sounds of the streets - voices, buses, traffic, and sirens - mixed with the music recorded in the studio."

Reception
Billboard described "Living for the City" as a "spectacular production of a country boy whose parents sacrifice themselves for him," and also praised the vocals and horn playing.

The song has won two Grammy Awards: one at the 1974 Grammy Awards for Best Rhythm & Blues Song, and the second for Best Male R&B Vocal Performance at the 1975 Grammy Awards for Ray Charles' recording on his album Renaissance.

It reached number 8 on the Billboard Hot 100 chart and number 1 on the R&B chart. Rolling Stone ranked the song number 104 on their 2004 list of the "500 Greatest Songs of All Time".

Personnel
 Stevie Wonder – lead vocal, background vocals, Fender Rhodes, drums, Moog bass, T.O.N.T.O. synthesizer, handclaps
 Calvin Hardaway (Wonder's brother); Ira Tucker Jr.; a New York police officer; attorney Jonathan Vigoda - other voices.

Influence
Public Enemy sampled the "get in that cell, nigger" in their song 'Black Steel in the Hour of Chaos.'

Chart performance

Weekly charts

Year-end charts

Cover versions 

Singers and Guitarist Ike & Tina Turner covered "Living for the City" in 1974 on their album Sweet Rhode Island Red.

Jazz pianist Ramsey Lewis covered "Living for the City" in 1974 on his album Sun Goddess.

Singer and pianist Ray Charles covered "Living for the City" in 1975 on his album Renaissance.

Dance music artist Sylvester, covered the song on their 11th studio album, Mutual Attraction, in 1986, the singer's major label debut album. Sylvester's "Living for the City" was released as the album's lead single and peaked at #2 on Billboard's Dance Club Play Chart.

Jazz pianist Michael McDonald covered "Living for the City" in 2008 on his album Soul Speak.

References

1973 singles
Stevie Wonder songs
Songs about New York City
Funk songs
Motown singles
Protest songs
Songs about poverty
Songs written by Stevie Wonder
Soul songs
Tamla Records singles
1973 songs
Ray Charles songs
Ike & Tina Turner songs
Songs against racism and xenophobia
Song recordings produced by Stevie Wonder